Bazarjan Rural District is a rural district (dehestan) in the Central District of Tafresh County, Markazi Province, Iran. At the 2006 census, its population was 3,779, in 1,275 families.

References 

Rural Districts of Markazi Province
Tafresh County